Nicholas Kiplangat Kipkoech (born 22 October 1992) is a Kenyan middle-distance runner specialising in the 800 metres.

References

1992 births
Living people
Kenyan male middle-distance runners
21st-century Kenyan people